Charles Smith Forster (1786 – 17 November 1850) was an English banker and Conservative politician who represented  Walsall in the 19th century.

Forster was born at Walsall, the son of Charles Forster and his wife Hannah Westley. He became a banker and Mayor of Walsall, before being elected the first MP for Walsall in the reformed parliament of 1832.  In 1845 he was  High Sheriff of Staffordshire.

Forster married Elizabeth Emery in 1813. His son Charles was also Member of Parliament for Walsall and became a baronet, of Lysways Hall

References

External links 
 

1786 births
1850 deaths
People from Walsall
Conservative Party (UK) MPs for English constituencies
UK MPs 1832–1835
UK MPs 1835–1837
High Sheriffs of Staffordshire
Tory MPs (pre-1834)